Tam Pa Ling (Cave of the Monkeys) is a cave in the Annamite Mountains in north-eastern Laos.

Three hominin fossils have been discovered in the cave: TPL1, a skull belonging to an anatomically modern human; TPL2, a mandible with both modern and archaic traits; and TPL3, a partial mandible with both modern and archaic traits. The three fossils represent three separate individuals and date from around 70,000 to 46,000 years old. The discoveries indicate that modern humans may have migrated to Southeast Asia by 60,000 BP.

Location and geology
Tam Pa Ling has a single, south-facing opening and descends  to its main gallery. It is part of a network of karst caves, formed by the dissolution of limestone beds that were laid down between the Upper Carboniferous and Permian periods.

Fossils
Excavations at the eastern end of the cave's main gallery, at the base of the sloped entrance, were conducted by a team of American, French and Laotian researchers starting in 2009.

Radiocarbon and luminescence dating of the sediments established a minimum age of 51,000 to 46,000 years, and direct uranium-thorium dating of the fossils indicated a maximum age of 63,000 years.

TPL1 includes the frontal, partial occipital, right parietal, and temporal bone, as well as the right and left maxillae and a largely complete dentition. It was identified as belonging to an anatomically modern human with distinct Sub-Saharan African features. , it provides the earliest skeletal evidence for the presence of Homo sapiens in mainland Southeast Asia.

The TPL2 mandible was found lower down in the same stratigraphic unit as TPL1, and represents a mature adult that combines archaic human features such as a robust mandibular corpus and small overall size, with modern human traits like a developed chin.

The bone fragment likely belonged to an adult. Like TPL2, TPL3 exhibits a mix of archaic and anatomically modern human traits, exhibiting modern human features such as having a developed chin but not having a robust mandibular corpus; however, TPL3 also retains archaic human features such as having a broad anterior mandibular arch. Luminescence dating of the TPL3 sediment layer provides a date range from around 70,000 to 48,000 years old.

Significance 
The timing of modern human migration from Africa to East Asia is not known with certainty; because bone is poorly preserved in tropical climates, human fossils from the region are rare. Recent discoveries in China, the Philippines, Sri Lanka and Australia had previously established that archaic human fossils were present between 125,000 and 100,000 BP, and those of modern humans from about 40,000 BP. The discovery of the fully modern TPL1 specimen was therefore considered a major discovery because it filled in a 60,000-year gap in the fossil record, demonstrating the presence of modern humans in Southeast Asia from at least 60,000 BP. Additionally, as Tam Pa Ling lies a thousand miles inland, the finds challenged previous assumptions that humans migrated out of Africa by following coastlines. They suggest that the migration may also have proceeded along river valleys, which served as natural corridors through the continent.

The fossils were temporarily removed to the United States for study by paleoanthropologist Laura Shackleford, Fabrice Demeter and the team. In April 2016 they were returned to Laos, and are now housed in a new building of the Lao National Museum in Vientiane.

See also
 Tham An Mah
 Laang Spean
 Early hominids in Southeast Asia

References

External links
 Anatomically modern human in Southeast Asia

Archaeological sites in Laos
Archaeology of Laos
Limestone caves
Paleoanthropological sites
Peopling of Southeast Asia
Caves of Laos